The Intel 8080 ("eighty-eighty") is the second 8-bit microprocessor designed and manufactured by Intel.  It first appeared in April 1974 and is an extended and enhanced variant of the earlier 8008 design, although without binary compatibility. The initial specified clock rate or frequency limit was 2 MHz, with common instructions using 4, 5, 7, 10, or 11 cycles. As a result, the processor is able to execute several hundred thousand instructions per second. Two faster variants, the 8080A-1 (sometimes referred to as the 8080B) and 8080A-2, became available later with clock frequency limits of 3.125 MHz and 2.63 MHz respectively.
The 8080 needs two support chips to function in most applications: the i8224 clock generator/driver and the i8228 bus controller. It is implemented in N-type metal–oxide–semiconductor logic (NMOS) using non-saturated enhancement mode transistors as loads thus demanding a +12 V and a −5 V voltage in addition to the main transistor–transistor logic (TTL) compatible +5 V.

Although earlier microprocessors were commonly used in mass-produced devices such as calculators, cash registers, computer terminals, industrial robots, and other applications, the 8080 saw greater success in a wider set of applications, and is largely credited with starting the microcomputer industry. Several factors contributed to its popularity: its 40-pin package made it easier to interface than the 18-pin 8008, and also made its data bus more efficient; its NMOS implementation gave it faster transistors than those of the P-type metal–oxide–semiconductor logic (PMOS) 8008, while also simplifying interfacing by making it TTL-compatible; a wider variety of support chips were available; its instruction set was enhanced over the 8008; and its full 16-bit address bus (versus the 14-bit one of the 8008) enabled it to access 64 KB of memory, four times more than the 8008's range of 16 KB. It was used in the Altair 8800 and subsequent S-100 bus personal computers until it was replaced by the Z80 in this role, and was the original target CPU for CP/M operating systems developed by Gary Kildall.

The 8080 directly influenced the later x86 architecture. Intel designed the 8086 to have its assembly language be similar enough to the 8080, with most instructions mapping directly onto each other, that transpiled 8080 assembly code could be executed on the 8086.

History
Microprocessor customers were reluctant to adopt the 8008 because of limitations such as the single addressing mode, low clock speed, low pin count, and small on-chip stack, which restricted the scale and complexity of software. There were several proposed designs for the 8080, ranging from simply adding stack instructions to the 8008 to a complete departure from all previous Intel architectures. The final design was a compromise between the proposals.

Federico Faggin, the originator of the 8080 architecture in early 1972, proposed the chip to Intel's management and pushed for its implementation. He finally got the permission to develop it six months later. Faggin hired Masatoshi Shima, who helped design the 4004 with him, from Japan in November 1972. Shima did the detailed design under Faggin's direction, using the design methodology for random logic with silicon gate that Faggin had created for the 4000 family. 

The 8080 was explicitly designed to be a general-purpose microprocessor for a larger number of customers. Much of the development effort was spent trying to integrate the functionalities of the 8008's supplemental chips into one package. It was decided early in development that the 8080 was not to be binary-compatible with the 8008, instead opting for source compatibility once run through a transpiler, to allow new software to not be subject to the same restrictions as the 8008. For the same reason, as well as the expand the capabilities of stack-based routines and interrupts, the stack was moved to external memory. 

Noting the specialized use of general-purpose registers by programmers in mainframe systems, Stanley Mazor, the chip architect, decided the 8080's registers would be specialized, with register pairs having a different set of uses. This also allowed the engineers to more effectively use transistors for other purposes. 

Shima finished the layout in August 1973. After the regulation of NMOS fabrication, a prototype of the 8080 was completed in January 1974. It had a flaw, in that driving with standard TTL devices increased the ground voltage because high current flowed into the narrow line. Intel had already produced 40,000 units of the 8080 at the direction of the sales section before Shima characterized the prototype. It was released as requiring Low-power Schottky TTL (LS TTL) devices. The 8080A fixed this flaw.

Intel offered an instruction set simulator for the 8080 named INTERP/80 to run compiled PL/M programs. It was written by Gary Kildall while he worked as a consultant for Intel.

Description

Programming model

The Intel 8080 is the successor to the 8008. It uses the same basic instruction set and register model as the 8008, although it is neither source code compatible nor binary code compatible with its predecessor. Every instruction in the 8008 has an equivalent instruction in the 8080. The 8080 also adds 16-bit operations in its instruction set. Whereas the 8008 required the use of the HL register pair to indirectly access its 14-bit memory space, the 8080 added addressing modes to allow direct access to its full 16-bit memory space. The internal 7-level push-down call stack of the 8008 was replaced by a dedicated 16-bit stack-pointer (SP) register. The 8080's 40-pin DIP packaging permits it to provide a 16-bit address bus and an 8-bit data bus, enabling access to 64 KiB (216 bytes) of memory.

Registers
The processor has seven 8-bit registers (A, B, C, D, E, H, and L), where A is the primary 8-bit accumulator. The other six registers can be used as either individual 8-bit registers or in three 16-bit register pairs (BC, DE, and HL, referred to as B, D and H in Intel documents) depending on the particular instruction. Some instructions also enable the HL register pair to be used as a (limited) 16-bit accumulator. A pseudo-register M, which refers to the dereferenced memory location pointed to by HL, can be used almost anywhere other registers can be used. The 8080 has a 16-bit stack pointer to memory, replacing the 8008's internal stack, and a 16-bit program counter.

Flags
The processor maintains internal flag bits (a status register), which indicate the results of arithmetic and logical instructions. Only certain instructions affect the flags. The flags are:
 Sign (S), set if the result is negative.
 Zero (Z), set if the result is zero.
 Parity (P), set if the number of 1 bits in the result is even.
 Carry (C), set if the last addition operation resulted in a carry or if the last subtraction operation required a borrow
 Auxiliary carry (AC or H), used for binary-coded decimal arithmetic (BCD).

The carry bit can be set or complemented by specific instructions. Conditional-branch instructions test the various flag status bits. The flags can be copied as a group to the accumulator. The A accumulator and the flags together are called the PSW register, or program status word.

Commands, instructions
As with many other 8-bit processors, all instructions are encoded in one byte (including register numbers, but excluding immediate data), for simplicity. Some can be followed by one or two bytes of data, which can be an immediate operand, a memory address, or a port number. Like more advanced processors, it has automatic CALL and RET instructions for multi-level procedure calls and returns (which can even be conditionally executed, like jumps) and instructions to save and restore any 16-bit register pair on the machine stack. Eight one-byte call instructions for subroutines exist at the fixed addresses 00h, 08h, 10h, ..., 38h. These are intended to be supplied by external hardware in order to invoke a corresponding interrupt service routine, but are also often employed as fast system calls.

8-bit instructions
All 8-bit operations with two operands can only be performed on the 8-bit accumulator (the A register). The other operand can be either an immediate value, another 8-bit register, or a memory byte addressed by the 16-bit register pair HL. Increments and decrements can be performed on any 8 bit register or an HL-addressed memory byte. Direct copying is supported between any two 8-bit registers and between any 8-bit register and an HL-addressed memory byte. Due to the regular encoding of the  instruction (using a quarter of available opcode space), there are redundant codes to copy a register into itself (for instance), which are of little use, except for delays.

16-bit operations
Although the 8080 is generally an 8-bit processor, it has limited abilities to perform 16-bit operations. Any of the three 16-bit register pairs (BC, DE, or HL, referred to as B, D, H in Intel documents) or SP can be loaded with an immediate 16-bit value (using ), incremented or decremented (using  and ), or added to HL (using ). By adding HL to itself, it is possible to achieve the same result as a 16-bit arithmetical left shift with one instruction. The  instruction exchanges the values of the HL and DE register pairs. exchanges last item pushed on stack with HL.

Input/output scheme

Input output port space
The 8080 supports up to 256 input/output (I/O) ports, accessed via dedicated I/O instructions taking port addresses as operands. This I/O mapping scheme is regarded as an advantage, as it frees up the processor's limited address space. Many CPU architectures instead use so-called memory-mapped I/O (MMIO), in which a common address space is used for both RAM and peripheral chips. This removes the need for dedicated I/O instructions, although a drawback in such designs may be that special hardware must be used to insert wait states, as peripherals are often slower than memory. However, in some simple 8080 computers, I/O is indeed addressed as if they were memory cells, "memory-mapped", leaving the I/O commands unused. I/O addressing can also sometimes employ the fact that the processor outputs the same 8-bit port address to both the lower and the higher address byte (i.e.,  would put the address 0505h on the 16-bit address bus). Similar I/O-port schemes are used in the backward-compatible Zilog Z80 and Intel 8085, and the closely related x86 microprocessor families.

Separate stack space
One of the bits in the processor state word (see below) indicates that the processor is accessing data from the stack. Using this signal, it is possible to implement a separate stack memory space. This feature is seldom used.

The internal state word
For more advanced systems, during one phase of its working loop, the processor set its "internal state byte" on the data bus. This byte contains flags that determine whether the memory or I/O port is accessed and whether it is necessary to handle an interrupt.

The interrupt system state (enabled or disabled) is also output on a separate pin. For simple systems, where the interrupts are not used, it is possible to find cases where this pin is used as an additional single-bit output port (the popular Radio-86RK computer made in the Soviet Union, for instance).

Example code
The following 8080/8085 assembler source code is for a subroutine named  that copies a block of data bytes of a given size from one location to another. The data block is copied one byte at a time, and the data movement and looping logic utilizes 16-bit operations.

Pin use

The address bus has its own 16 pins, and the data bus has 8 pins that are usable without any multiplexing. Using the two additional pins (read and write signals), it is possible to assemble simple microprocessor devices very easily. Only the separate IO space, interrupts, and DMA need added chips to decode the processor pin signals. However, the pin load capacity is limited; even simple computers often require bus amplifiers.

The processor needs three power sources (−5, +5, and +12 V) and two non-overlapping high-amplitude synchronizing signals. However, at least the late Soviet version КР580ВМ80А was able to work with a single +5 V power source, the +12 V pin being connected to +5 V and the −5 V pin to ground.

The pin-out table, from the chip's accompanying documentation, describes the pins as follows:

Support chips 
A key factor in the success of the 8080 was the broad range of support chips available, providing serial communications, counter/timing, input/output, direct memory access, and programmable interrupt control amongst other functions:
 8238 – System controller and bus driver
 8251 – Communication controller
 8253 – Programmable interval timer
 8255 – Programmable peripheral interface
 8257 – DMA controller
 8259 – Programmable interrupt controller

Physical implementation
The 8080 integrated circuit uses non-saturated enhancement-load nMOS gates, demanding extra voltages (for the load-gate bias). It was manufactured in a silicon gate process using a minimal feature size of 6 µm. A single layer of metal is used to interconnect the approximately 4,500 transistors in the design, but the higher resistance polysilicon layer, which required higher voltage for some interconnects, is implemented with transistor gates. The die size is approximately 20 mm2.

Industrial impact

Applications and successors

The 8080 is used in many early microcomputers, such as the MITS Altair 8800 Computer, Processor Technology SOL-20 Terminal Computer and IMSAI 8080 Microcomputer, forming the basis for machines running the CP/M operating system (the later, almost fully compatible and more able, Zilog Z80 processor would capitalize on this, with Z80 and CP/M becoming the dominant CPU and OS combination of the period circa 1976 to 1983 much as did the x86 and DOS for the PC a decade later).

In 1979, even after the introduction of the Z80 and 8085 processors, five manufacturers of the 8080 were selling an estimated 500,000 units per month at a price around $3 to $4 each.

The first single-board microcomputers, such as MYCRO-1 and the dyna-micro / MMD-1 (see: Single-board computer) were based on the Intel 8080. One of the early uses of the 8080 was made in the late 1970s by Cubic-Western Data of San Diego, California, in its Automated Fare Collection Systems custom designed for mass transit systems around the world. An early industrial use of the 8080 is as the "brain" of the DatagraphiX Auto-COM (Computer Output Microfiche) line of products which takes large amounts of user data from reel-to-reel tape and images it onto microfiche. The Auto-COM instruments also include an entire automated film cutting, processing, washing, and drying sub-system. Several early video arcade games were built around the 8080 microprocessor, including Space Invaders, one of the most popular arcade games ever made.

Zilog introduced the Z80, which has a compatible machine language instruction set and initially used the same assembly language as the 8080, but for legal reasons, Zilog developed a syntactically-different (but code compatible) alternative assembly language for the Z80. At Intel, the 8080 was followed by the compatible and electrically more elegant 8085.

Later, Intel issued the assembly-language compatible (but not binary-compatible) 16-bit 8086 and then the 8/16-bit 8088, which was selected by IBM for its new PC to be launched in 1981. Later NEC made the NEC V20 (an 8088 clone with Intel 80186 instruction set compatibility) which also supports an 8080 emulation mode. This is also supported by NEC's V30 (a similarly enhanced 8086 clone). Thus, the 8080, via its instruction set architecture (ISA), made a lasting impact on computer history.

A number of processors compatible with the Intel 8080A were manufactured in the Eastern Bloc: the KR580VM80A (initially marked as КР580ИК80) in the Soviet Union, the MCY7880 made by Unitra CEMI in Poland, the MHB8080A made by TESLA in Czechoslovakia, the 8080APC made by Tungsram / MEV in Hungary, and the MMN8080 made by Microelectronica Bucharest in Romania.

, the 8080 is still in production at Lansdale Semiconductors.

Industry change

The 8080 also changed how computers were created. When the 8080 was introduced, computer systems were usually created by computer manufacturers such as Digital Equipment Corporation, Hewlett Packard, or IBM. A manufacturer would produce the whole computer, including processor, terminals, and system software such as compilers and operating system. The 8080 was designed for almost any application except a complete computer system. Hewlett Packard developed the HP 2640 series of smart terminals around the 8080. The HP 2647 is a terminal which runs the programming language BASIC on the 8080. Microsoft's founding product, Microsoft BASIC, was originally programmed for the 8080.

The 8080 and 8085 gave rise to the 8086, which was designed as a source code compatible, albeit not binary compatible, extension of the 8080. This design, in turn, later spawned the x86 family of chips, which continue to be Intel's primary line of processors.  Many of the 8080's core machine instructions and concepts survive in the widespread x86 platform.  Examples include the registers named A, B, C, and D and many of the flags used to control conditional jumps. 8080 assembly code can still be directly translated into x86 instructions, since all of its core elements are still present.

Cultural impact
 Asteroid 8080 Intel is named as a pun and praise on the name of Intel 8080.
 Microsoft's published phone number, 425-882-8080, was chosen because much early work was on this chip.
 Many of Intel's main phone numbers also take a similar form: xxx-xxx-8080

See also
 CP/M – operating system
 S-100 bus
 MPT8080

References

Further reading
 ; 495 pages
 ; 332 pages
 ; 466 pages
 ; 180 pages

External links
 Intel and other manufacturers' 8080 CPU images and descriptions at cpu-collection.de
 Scan of the Intel 8080 data book at DataSheetArchive.com
 Microcomputer Design, Second Edition, 1976
 8080 Emulator written in JavaScript
 Intel 8080/KR580VM80A emulator in JavaScript
 Intel 8080 Microcomputer Systems User's Manual (September 1975, 262 pages)
 Intel 8080 Microcomputer Systems User's Manual (September 1975, 234 pages)
 Intel 8080/8085 Instruction Reference Card
 

Computer-related introductions in 1974
8-bit microprocessors